Hernán Carrasco Vivanco  (born 29 March 1928) is a former Chilean football (soccer) manager.

Career
Carrasco created a legacy in El Salvador by winning five Primera División titles with Alianza F.C. in 1966, 1967, 1989 and CONCACAF Champions' Cup in 1967 - Atlético Marte 1969, 1970 and Águila in 1968 and in 1987 he won a Primera División National Championship and also coached the El Salvador national team at 1970 FIFA World Cup in Mexico.

However it was an unhappy campaign losing all three games and he resigned afterwards. He made an important contribution to the development of one of the best teams in Chilean history: Universidad de Chile "Blue Ballet". He was for many years president of the Chilean coaches and was one of the founders of the Salvadoran Coaches Association.

He has his own football school called the Academia Futuro de Hernán Carrasco Vivanco.

Honours

Manager

Club
Alianza F.C.
 Primera División
 Champion (3): 1965-66, 1966-67, 1989-90

 CONCACAF Champions' Cup
 Champion (1): 1967

Atletico Marte
 Primera División
 Champion (2): 1969, 1970

Colo-Colo
 Chilean Primera División
 Champion (1): 1960

References

1928 births
Living people
People from Arauco Province
Chilean football managers
Chilean expatriate football managers
Expatriate football managers in El Salvador
Chilean expatriate sportspeople in El Salvador
Colo-Colo managers
O'Higgins F.C. managers
Audax Italiano managers
El Salvador national football team managers
C.D. Águila managers
Atletico Marte managers
Deportes Antofagasta managers
Universidad de Chile managers
C.D. Luis Ángel Firpo managers
C.D. FAS managers
Municipal Limeño managers
Chilean Primera División managers
1970 FIFA World Cup managers
Salvadoran football managers